The Augustana Catholic Church (ACC), formerly the Anglo-Lutheran Catholic Church (ALCC) and the Evangelical Community Church-Lutheran (ECCL), was an American church in the Lutheran Evangelical Catholic tradition.

The ACC said it was unique among Lutheran churches in that it was of both Lutheran and Anglo-Catholic heritage and had also been significantly influenced by the Roman Catholic Church. The church was founded in 1997 by former members of the Lutheran Church–Missouri Synod. Its headquarters were in Pittsburgh, Pennsylvania. The ACC long had a policy of seeking union with the Roman Catholic Church and announced in 2011 that it would accept the conditions of Anglicanorum coetibus and join the personal ordinariates as they are established. Later developments on limitations of joining the ordinariate caused the ACC to hold their offer while they established intercommunion with groups such as the Old Roman Catholic Church of North America. The church claimed a membership in excess of 60,000 in 12 countries. 

In 2020, former bishop Kenneth Bakken reported that the denomination had been dissolved as a U.S. organization.

Doctrine
The Augustana Catholic Church considered Lutherans to be Catholics in a temporary involuntary schism imposed on it by the Roman Catholic Church when Martin Luther's attempt to start a renewal movement within Roman Catholicism slipped out of his control. The ACC taught that Lutheranism in general is a form of non-Roman Catholicism, and considered the other Lutheran churches to be "Protestant" only to the extent that they have accepted insights from the Calvinist and Zwinglian phases of the Reformation.

The Augustana Catholic Church accepted the Unaltered Augsburg Confession, the Apology of the Augsburg Confession, and Martin Luther's Small Catechism, but only insofar as they are in full agreement with Roman Catholic faith and order, doctrines, and traditions. The ACC recognizes the other documents contained in The Book of Concord—except for the Formula of Concord—but only insofar as they are in full agreement with Roman Catholic faith, order, doctrines and traditions. It did not accept the Formula of Concord on any level, nor did it consider itself bound by any of its terms and provisions, though it respected it as a historical Lutheran document.

The Augustana Catholic Church accepted papal primacy and papal infallibility even though it was not under papal control.

Orders
The Augustana Catholic Church never had female clergy for the same reasons the Roman Catholic Church rejects the ordination of women, and placed a moratorium on the ordination of women until such time as it is ordered by a Pope (for the diaconate) or an Ecumenical Council (for the priesthood and episcopacy). The ACC had the same policies as the Roman Catholic Church on the ordination of non celibate homosexual persons and the blessing of same-sex unions, permitting neither.

Petition for unity with the Holy See
On May 15, 2009, and again in 2014, the Augustana Catholic Church officially filed a formal petition to enter the Roman Catholic Church "as a unified body" in whichever form the Pope and the Curia decides is the most appropriate. The ACC's petition was filed with the Council for Promoting Christian Unity, and is before the Congregation for the Doctrine of the Faith. It was a separate petition from that of the Traditional Anglican Communion.

Leadership
 The Most Reverend Robert W. Edmondson (d. 2020), Metropolitan Archbishop of the Augustana Catholic Church; Director, Office of the Director of Temporal Administration and Finance; Director, Office of the Director of Military Services and Veteran’s Affairs
 The Most Reverend Kenneth L. Bakken, Vicar General of the Augustana Catholic Church
 The Most Reverend Tan Binh Phan Nguyen, Dean of the Holy Synod; Director, Office of the Vicar General for Vietnamese Churches
 The Most Reverend Thomas Stover, Bishop, Diocese of the West; Director of Evangelism and Church Growth, Office of the Metropolitan Archbishop

Dissolution
Archbishop Edmondson died in 2020, and his published obituary described him not as a Lutheran clergyman, but as a member of the Latter-day Saints Church. Later in 2020, Bishop Bakken's website reported that the church had dissolved as a U.S. organization, although the church was still active in Haiti, Ecuador, and African countries.

See also
 High Church Lutheranism
 Independent Catholic churches
 Porvoo Communion, European communion of Anglican and Lutheran churches

References and notes

External links
 Augustana Catholic Church
 Archdiocese of Pittsburgh and the Ohio Valley website

Anglo-Catholicism
Christian organizations established in 1997
Christian organizations disestablished in 2020
Lutheranism in the United States
Lutheran denominations in North America
Lutheran denominations established in the 20th century
Independent Catholic denominations
Former Christian denominations